Chamblee High School, formerly known as Chamblee Charter High School, is a public secondary school located in Chamblee, Georgia, United States. As of 2010, it serves 1512 students in grades 9–12. It is the second oldest high school of the DeKalb County School District, having opened in 1917.

Chamblee was a charter school until 2021 and accepts students from all of Dekalb County as well as from its local district. Chamblee was named a National Blue Ribbon School of Excellence in 1996 and is one of 27% of schools in Dekalb to make the AYP of the No Child Left Behind Act. CHS was ranked #215 of the 1500 best public high schools by Newsweek magazine. Its students' SAT scores are ranked first in Dekalb County and sixth in the state.

When adjusted for differences in demographics, Chamblee High School has the highest SAT scores of all Atlanta-metro schools (including Cobb, Gwinnett, and Forsyth). Its 84th percentile ranking is superior to Walton (73rd percentile) and other suburban counterparts. The student body also has one of the highest acceptance rates to tier 1 colleges and universities in the state of Georgia.

The school offers a variety of extracurricular activities, courses, and sports. There are elective performing art classes which are bolstered by performances. CCHS offers 32 AP courses, the most of any high school in Dekalb County, and was named an AP Honor School in 2011 for every category in which it was eligible.

History

Prior to 1917: Chamblee High School and Chamblee Elementary School were housed in a single building on the present site of the First Baptist Church of Chamblee.
1917: DeKalb County authorized the purchase of land for the high school on Chamblee Dunwoody road. Construction began.
1919: The first classes were held in the partially completed school.
1922: M.E. "Prof" Smith was named principal. He served for 35 years.
1924: Ten classrooms and DeKalb County's first gymnasium were added to the campus.
1928: A home economics building was added.
1934: Depression-era WPA funding allowed Chamblee High School to add eight new classrooms, a new gymnasium, a canning plant, and a machine shop. The school became the first in DeKalb County to be accredited by the Southern Association of Colleges and Schools.
December 8, 1941: The entire campus burned to the ground. Classes were relocated to area hospitals and Baptist and Methodist churches.
December 1942: The high school was rebuilt and classes resumed on campus.
1950: A lighted general athletic field was built for football and baseball games.
1962: North DeKalb Stadium opened next door to Chamblee High School.
1964: The school was remodeled, adding 19 classrooms and five laboratories.
1966: The new basketball gymnasium, chorus rooms, band rooms, and swimming pool were added.
1970: The old basketball gymnasium and home economics building were demolished. A new cafeteria was built on the site.
1973: The old 1942 classrooms were demolished and a new administration building and library were built.
1991: The first magnet class entered Chamblee High School.
1994: Chamblee High was named a National School of Excellence.
2001: Chamblee High was named a State School of Excellence.
2001: Chamblee High became a charter school.
2011: Senior and Sophomore halls were torn down for the rebuilding of the new school.
December 20, 2013: Demolition of the remaining old building started.
January 7, 2014: The new academic building held its first day of school.

Facility
The school is adjacent to North Dekalb Stadium, which is used by many sports teams and local schools.   It was last renovated in 2014, using $58 million in federal stimulus bonds as well as $11 million already set aside by the special-purpose local-option sales tax.

Athletics 
The Chamblee Bulldogs participate in baseball, basketball, badminton, cheerleading, cross country, football, golf, lacrosse, soccer, softball, swimming & diving, tennis, track and field, ultimate frisbee, volleyball, water polo, and wrestling. The varsity football, lacrosse and soccer teams play their home games at North DeKalb Stadium in Chamblee.

State championships

As of the 2021–22 season.

Key:

Athletics
 Boys' track: 1954, 1960, 1964
 Wrestling: 1974, 1979
 Boys' tennis: 1998, 2019
 Girls' tennis: 2017, 2018, 2019
 Girls' cross country: 1981
 Boys' cross country: 1986
 Boys' soccer: 2008
 Cheerleading: 2007, 2008, 2009
 Boys' swimming: 400 free relay (2015), 2015, 200 freestyle (2013, 100 breaststroke) (2008, 50 freestyle)
 Girls' swimming: 2019 AAAA-AAAAA State Champions, 200 medley relay (2019, 2017, 1975), 100 Butterfly (2019, 2018, 2017, 2016), 200 IM (2019, 2018), (2004, 50 freestyle) (1987, 100 butterfly) (1983, 100 butterfly) (1976, 200 freestyle and 100 freestyle; 1975, 200 freestyle and 100 butterfly; 1974, 200 IM and 100 butterfly) (1974, 500 freestyle), Lanoue (1956, 200 freestyle)

Academics
 TEAMS (academic competition): 2009, 2010
 PAGE Academic Bowl: 1994, 2011
 Science Olympiad: 1997, 1998
 Math Team: 2003
 Math Counts: 1991, 1992
 We The People: The Citizen and the Constitution: 1995, 1996, 2004, 2006, 2007, 2012
 Chess: 2006, 2007
 GearGrinders - FIRST Robotics Team: 2006
 Debate 2006, 2007
 Odyssey of the Mind: 2004, 2005, 2006

Feeder schools
The following schools feed into Chamblee Charter High School:
 Chamblee Middle School
 Sequoyah Middle School
The following schools feed into Chamblee Middle School:
 Ashford Park
 Huntley Hills
 Kittredge Magnet School
 Montgomery

School newspaper

The Blue and Gold is Chamblee Charter High School's official school newspaper. The current faculty advisor of the Blue and Gold is Fred Avett. Currently, the Blue and Gold is published online and in a print format.

Notable alumni
This is a list of notable alumni that graduated from Chamblee Charter High School, sorted by year of graduation.

Brandon Armstrong (Class of 2008), viral YouTuber and NBA impressionist 
John Casper (class of 1961), space shuttle astronaut
Tim Chen (class of 2000), founder and CEO of NerdWallet
Coleman Collins (class of 2003), basketball player and writer
Paul Delaney (class of 2004), basketball player in the Israeli National League
Ryan Gravel (class of 1991), creator of the Atlanta Beltline
Warren Norman (Class of 2009), former football player for the Vanderbilt Commodores
Troy Sadowski (class of 1984), former Atlanta Falcons tight end
Andy Spiva (class of 1973), former Atlanta Falcons linebacker
Teresa Tomlinson (class of 1983), former mayor of Columbus, Georgia and 2020 Democratic candidate for United States Senate
Steve Wallace (class of 1982), former San Francisco 49ers tackle, part of three Super Bowl championships with the San Francisco 49ers (1988, 1989, 1994)
Susan Walters (class of 1981), actress and former model

References

External links

Chamblee High School website

DeKalb County School District high schools
Educational institutions established in 1917
Magnet schools in Georgia (U.S. state)
Charter schools in Georgia (U.S. state)
Chamblee, Georgia
1917 establishments in Georgia (U.S. state)